The Dewellbon Cup 2015 Yongchuan International Tournament was the inaugural edition of the Yongchuan International Tournament, an invitational women's football tournament held in Yongchuan District, Chongqing, China.

Participants
In September 2015, the participants were announced. New Zealand withdrew from the tournament in October 2015.

Venues

Standings

Match results
All times are local, CST (UTC+8).

Statistics

References 

2015 in women's association football
2017
2015 in Chinese football
October 2015 sports events in China
2015 in Chinese women's sport